Edward Brany Cabrera (born April 13, 1998) is a Dominican professional baseball pitcher for the Miami Marlins of Major League Baseball (MLB). He made his MLB debut in 2021.

Career
Cabrera signed with the Miami Marlins as an international free agent in July 2015. He made his professional debut in 2016 with the Gulf Coast Marlins, going 2–6 with a 4.21 ERA over 47 innings. He played 2017 with the Batavia Muckdogs, pitching to a 1–3 record and a 5.30 ERA over 13 games (six starts), and 2018 with the Greensboro Grasshoppers, compiling a 4–8 record with a 4.22 ERA over 22 starts.

Cabrera started 2019 with the Jupiter Hammerheads, earning Florida State League All-Star honors, before being promoted to the Jacksonville Jumbo Shrimp. Over 19 starts between both clubs, Cabrera went 9–4 with a 2.23 ERA, striking out 116 over  innings. Cabrera was added to the Marlins 40-man roster following the 2019 season.

Cabrera did not play in a game in 2020 due to the cancellation of the minor league season because of the COVID-19 pandemic. On August 21, 2021, Cabrera was promoted to the active roster to make his MLB debut. Cabrera made his MLB debut and earned a no-decision on August 25, pitching  innings and allowing three runs in a 4–3 victory over the Washington Nationals.

On June 1, 2022, Cabrera earned his first career win over the Colorado Rockies.

References

External links

1998 births
Living people
People from Santiago de los Caballeros
Dominican Republic expatriate baseball players in the United States
Major League Baseball players from the Dominican Republic
Major League Baseball pitchers
Miami Marlins players
Gulf Coast Marlins players
Batavia Muckdogs players
Greensboro Grasshoppers players
Jupiter Hammerheads players
Jacksonville Jumbo Shrimp players
Pensacola Blue Wahoos players